The Salvadoran Primera División de Fútbol Profesional Apertura 2003 season (officially "Torneo Apertura 2003") started on August 2, 2003.

The season was composed of the following clubs:

 C.D. FAS
 Municipal Limeño
 San Salvador F.C.
 C.D. Águila
 C.D. Luis Ángel Firpo
 A.D. Isidro Metapán
 C.D. Atlético Balboa
 Alianza F.C.
 C.D. Arcense
 Chalatenango

Team information

Personnel and sponsoring

Managerial changes

Before the season

During the season

Apertura 2003 standings
Last updated August 2, 2003

4th place playoff

Semifinals 1st Leg

Semifinals 2nd Leg

Final

List of foreign players in the league
This is a list of foreign players in Apertura 2003. The following players:
have played at least one apetura game for the respective club.
have not been capped for the El Salvador national football team on any level, independently from the birthplace

C.D. Águila
  Dario Larrosa
  Anderson da Silva
  Paulo Medina
  Luis Almada
  Julio Romana

Alianza F.C.
  Diego De Rosa
  Luis Espindola
  Oscar Vallejo
  Jorge Puglia
  José Denis Conde

Atletico Balboa
  Luis Carlos Asprilla
  Juan Carlos Mosquera
  John Polo
  Nito Gonzales
  Daniel Prediguer
  Enzo Calderon

Arcense
  Juan La Vaca
  Martin Uranga
  Victor Hugo Sanchez
  Jorge Wagner
  Mario Pavon
  Hector Rojas

Chalatenango
  Libardo Carvajal
  Alexander Obregon
  Jorge Sandoval
  Henry Sevillano
  Gabriel Cespedes
  Adolfo Vaca

 (player released mid season)
  (player Injured mid season)
 Injury replacement player

C.D. FAS
  Alejandro de la Cruz Bentos
  Marcelo Messias
  Felipe Ximenez
  Victor Hugo Mafla
  Williams Reyes
  Eduardo Arriola

C.D. Luis Ángel Firpo
  Paulo César Rodrigues Lima
  Juan Pablo Chacón
  Gustavo Cabrera
  Óscar Abreu Mejía
  Orvin Cabrera

A.D. Isidro Metapán
  Diego Alvarez
  Gustavo Vecchiarelli
  Wilson Sanchez
  Oswaldo Nelson Duarte

Municipal Limeno
  Dante Segovia
  Gabriel Kinjo
  Gerson Mier
  Miguel Mariano

San Salvador F.C.
  Rodrigo Lagos
  Emiliano Pedrozo
  Orlando Garces
  Franklin Webster

External links
 

Primera División de Fútbol Profesional Apertura seasons
El
1